Diego Octavio Jiménez Villa (born 7 April 1986 in Tepatitlán, Jalisco) is a Mexican former footballer who played as defender for Estudiantes Tecos of Ascenso MX. He is known as "Tepa".

Club career
His career started with the Estudiantes reserve side, appearing in 29 matches and scoring one goal. He then went to Tecos 2A side, where he anchored the back line during the 2004 Clausura appearing in all 17 matches. His play in 2005 with Tecomán drew the attention of the Tecos UAG first team and Jiménez was quickly called up by Tecos. He debuted with Tecos in the Mexican First Division during the 2005 Apertura and made 11 appearances including seven starts.

After a lengthy pursuit for his signature, Jiménez was loaned to New York Red Bulls of Major League Soccer during the July 2008 transfer window by UAG Tecos. After signing it took a while for Jiménez to establish himself at the club. Suspensions and ineffective play by the team's starting central defenders, opened up an opportunity for Diego. Jiménez started both legs of the club's improbable 4-1 aggregate victory over defending champion Houston Dynamo in the 2008 MLS Playoffs, leading the backline in negating one of the league's most potent attacks. He then helped New York reach the 2008 MLS Cup by defeating Real Salt Lake 1–0 in Utah.

National team
Jiménez  was a starter on Mexico's Under-21 and Under-20 National Team, including playing in the Touloun Youth Tournament in France in 2006.

Statistics

Honours
New York Red Bulls
 Major League Soccer Western Conference Championship: 2008

References

External links
statistics 2006-2008
Mexican First Division Statistics

1986 births
Living people
Association football defenders
Mexican expatriate footballers
Mexican footballers
Tecos F.C. footballers
New York Red Bulls players
Atlético Morelia players
Liga MX players
Major League Soccer players
Mexican expatriate sportspeople in the United States
Expatriate soccer players in the United States
Atlante F.C. footballers
Footballers from Jalisco
People from Tepatitlán